Los Lirios Airport ,  is a rural airport  north of Curicó, a city in the Maule Region of Chile.

The runway has  of unpaved overrun on the north end.

See also

Transport in Chile
List of airports in Chile

References

External links
OpenStreetMap - Los Lirios
OurAirports - Los Lirios
SkyVector - Los Lirios
FallingRain - Los Lirios Airport

Airports in Chile
Airports in Maule Region